The Lausanne University Hospital (CHUV), in Lausanne, is one of the five university hospitals in Switzerland.

The Lausanne University Hospital is linked to the Faculty of Biology and Medicine of the University of Lausanne (UNIL).

The CHUV's medical services benefit over 45,000 patients a year. Almost 3000 babies are born every year in the obstetrics department. Approximately  9000 employees work at the CHUV.

The university hospital acts as a general university hospital for people living in the Lausanne area, covering all areas of medical treatment. It also serves as a hospital offering acute and specialist care for the whole Canton of Vaud and also some neighbouring Cantons.

In 2021, like in the previous year, CHUV has been ranked as the 9th best hospital in the world by Newsweek Magazine. In 2019, the university hospital was rated as the leading hospital in Switzerland.

Organisation 
Departments of the University Hospital of Lausanne:
 Department of Emergency Medicine
 Department of Oncology (UNIL-CHUV)
 Department of Obstetric Gynaecology and Medical Genetics
 Department of the Musculoskeletal System
 Department of Education and Research (UNIL-CHUV)
 Department of Medicine
 Department of Psychiatry, see also Hospital of Cery
 Department of Medical Radiology
 Department of Interdisciplinary Centres and Medical Logistics
 Department of Laboratories
 Department of Clinical Neurosciences (there is a Department of Fundamental Neurosciences at the University of Lausanne)
 Department of Surgery and Anaesthesiology Services
 Department of Hospital Logistics
 Department of Community Medicine and Health

Main campus 

The University Hospital of Lausanne is located in Lausanne, close to the centre of the city. It is served by the Lausanne Metro Line 2, from the "CHUV" station.

Other sites 

Some laboratories are located in Épalinges (north of Lausanne), on a campus shared with the University of Lausanne and the Biopôle.

The Hospital of Cery, the psychiatric hospital of the University Hospital of Lausanne, is located in Prilly, in the urban area of Lausanne.

Missions 

The missions of the hospital are care to the patients, research and teaching.

On 28 October 2014, the World Health Organization welcomed approval by the Swiss Agency for Therapeutic Products of a vaccine trial against Ebola virus at the University Hospital of Lausanne.

The CHUV is part of the 'Lausanne Integrative Metabolism and Nutrition Alliance', a joint research initiative aiming to promote research and education on metabolism, nutrition, ageing and all associated diseases, such as obesity, diabetes or cancer, in Lausanne area.

Magazine 

The University Hospital of Lausanne publish In vivo, a free magazine aimed at a large audience (general public). It is produced by the Swiss media agency Large Network and published in French and English.

Associated institutions 

 Swiss Cancer Centre
 Ludwig Cancer Research
 Center for Biomedical Imaging (CIBM)
 Institut universitaire romand de santé au travail (IST)
 École romande de santé publique (ERSP)
 University Centre of Legal Medicine (CURML)
 Swiss Laboratory for Doping Analyses
 Biopôle
 Jules Gonin Eye Hospital

See also 
 List of university hospitals
 Lausanne campus

Notes and references

External links 

  University Hospital of Lausanne

Lausanne
Hospital
Buildings and structures in Lausanne
Education in Lausanne